The Helanshan montane conifer forests ecoregion (WWF ID: PA0508) covers an isolated, forested mountain range surrounded by desert and semi-arid basins.  As such, it has been called a "mountain island in the sky", and supports endemic species of plants and animals.  The region supports the endangered Helan Shan pika.

Location and description 

The Helan Mountains ecoregions lies to the east of the Alashan Plateau semi-desert ecoregion, and to the west of the Ordos plateau steppe ecoregion.  It is thus surrounded by arid basins.  The mountain range is 180 km long, and reaches a peak altitude of 3,556 meters. The lower valleys between ridges are less forested.

Climate 
The climate of the ecoregion is cold semi-arid (Köppen climate classification (BSk)).  This climate is generally characterized as a 'steppe' climate, with precipitation greater than a true desert, and also a colder temperature.

Flora and fauna 
Within the ecoregion, tree cover depends on the altitude zone.  The lower slopes of the mountains are semi-arid, supporting short Siberian elm (Ulmus pumila) trees near intermittent streams.  The valleys also support stands of Chinese red pine (Pinus tabuliformis).  Higher on the hillsides are drought-adapted shrubs of rose, elm, caranga, ostryopsis (a type of birch tree), and juniper.  At the highest elevations, tree cover is mostly dragon spruce (Picea asperata, birch and poplar.)

References 

Palearctic ecoregions
Ecoregions of China
Montane forests
Temperate coniferous forests